The Seaboard Air Line Depot can refer to the following former and active train stations previously used by the Seaboard Air Line Railroad, many of which are listed on the National Register of Historic Places:

Alabama
Birmingham Terminal Station
Union Station (Montgomery, Alabama)

Florida
Apopka Seaboard Air Line Railway Depot
Auburndale (SAL station) (Auburndale, Florida)
Bay Pines (SAL station)
Belleview (SAL station) (Belleview, Florida)
Charlotte Harbor and Northern Railway Depot (Boca Grande)
Clearwater station (Amtrak)
Deerfield Beach Seaboard Air Line Railway Station
Delray Beach Seaboard Air Line Railway Station
Fort Lauderdale Seaboard Air Line Railway Station
Fort Myers (SAL station)
Old Gainesville Depot
Hawthorne (SAL station)
Hialeah Seaboard Air Line Railway Station
Hollywood (SAL station)
Homestead Seaboard Air Line Railway Station
Inverness (SAL station)
Largo (SAL station)
Leesburg (SAL station)
Live Oak Union Depot
Naples Railroad Depot
Ocala Union Station
Okeechobee (Amtrak station)
Opa-locka Seaboard Air Line Railway Station
Orlando (SAL station)
Plant City Union Depot
Sarasota (SAL station)
Old Sebring Seaboard Air Line Depot
Seaboard Coast Line Railroad station (St. Petersburg, Florida)
Tallahassee (Amtrak station)
Union Station (Tampa, Florida)
Venice Seaboard Air Line Depot
Waldo (Amtrak station)
West Lake Wales (SAL station)
West Palm Beach (Tri-Rail station)
Wildwood (Amtrak station)
Williston (SAL station)
Winter Haven (Amtrak station)
Yulee (SAL station)

Georgia
Athens (SAL station)
Terminal Station (Atlanta)
Colbert (SAL station)
Comer (SAL station)
Elberton (SAL station)
Emory (SAL station)
Lawrenceville (SAL station)
Plains (SAL station)
Rockmart (SAL station)
Union Station (Savannah)
Tucker (SAL station)
Winder (SAL station)

North Carolina
Apex (SAL station)
Bladenboro (SAL station)
Bostic (SAL station)
Caroleen (SAL station)
Charlotte (SAL station)
Seaboard Air Line Railway Depot (Cherryville, North Carolina), listed on the NRHP in Gaston County, North Carolina
Clarkton (SAL station)
Colon (SAL station)
Conway (SAL station)
Creedmore (SAL station)
Ellenboro (SAL station)
Franklinton (SAL station)
Gibson (SAL station)
Gumberry (SAL station)
Hamlet (SAL station) (Hamlet, North Carolina)
Henderson (SAL station)Hoffman (SAL station)Kelford (SAL station)Latimore (SAL station)Lumberton (SAL station)Matthews (SAL station)Maxton (SAL station)Monroe (SAL station)Pendelton (SAL station)Polkton (SAL station)Union Station (Raleigh, North Carolina)Roanoke Rapids (SAL station)Rockingham (SAL station)Sanford (SAL station)Southern Pines (SAL station)Vaughan (SAL station)Wadesboro (SAL station)Waxhaw (SAL station)Weldon (SAL station)South CarolinaAbbeville (SAL station)Calhoun (SAL station)Camden (SAL station)Charleston (SAL station)Cheraw (SAL station)Chester (SAL station)Clinton (SAL station)Columbia (SAL station)Darlington (SAL station)
Denmark (SAL station)Elgin (SAL station)Estill (SAL station)Fairfax (SAL station)Florence (SAL station)Greenwood (SAL station)Jamestown (SAL station)Lamar (SAL station)Livingston (SAL station)Lugoff (SAL station)Seaboard Air Line Railway Depot in McBeeNorth, South Carolina (SAL station)Seaboard Air Line Railway Depot in PatrickPrichard (SAL station)Sycamore (SAL station)Timmonsville (SAL station)Woodford (SAL station)'''

Virginia
Broad Street Station (Richmond)
Richmond Main Street Station
Seaboard Coastline Building (Portsmouth)